Rafał Berliński (born 5 June 1976 in Płock) is a Polish footballer.

References
 

1976 births
Living people
Polish footballers
Zagłębie Sosnowiec players
GKS Bełchatów players
Sandecja Nowy Sącz players
Kolejarz Stróże players
Association football defenders
Polish expatriate footballers
Raków Częstochowa players
FK Haugesund players
Odra Opole players
OKS Stomil Olsztyn players
Szczakowianka Jaworzno players
Sportspeople from Płock